Daradahalli Byregowda Chandregowda (born 26 August 1936), is a former Speaker of Karnataka Legislative Assembly, three-term MLA, one-term MLC, and Member of Parliament—three-term from Lok Sabha and one-term from Rajya sabha.

He worked as Leader of Opposition in Karnataka Legislative Assembly and Minister for Law and Parliamentary Affairs in Government of Karnataka representing several political parties in his long political career – Praja Socialist Party, Janata Dal, Congress, and Bharatiya Janata Party.

Biography
He was born at Daradahalli of Mudigere Taluk, Chikkamagaluru district, Karnataka on 26 August 1936 to D. A. Byre Gowda and Puttamma. He did his BSc education from Renukacharya College, Bangalore and LLB from R. L. Law College, Belgaum. He married Purna Chandre Gowda on 22 May 1966 and was blessed with four daughters.

He learnt his leadership skills paving the way for a long political career during his college days; he was elected vice-president of the Renukacharya college students association. While at R. L. Law College, he became the General Secretary of the R.L. Law College. He was in the Praja Socialist Party till 1967. In 1971, he got elected to 5th Lok Sabha from Chikmagalur constituency representing INC – Congress party. He was re-elected to 6th Lok Sabha from Chikmagalur, but vacated his seat later to allow Indira Gandhi to contest and win the election from there.

Between 1978 and 1983, he became a member of Karnataka Legislative Council and worked as Cabinet minister in Government of Karnataka from 1979 to 1980. In 1980, he resigned from Congress and joined Karnataka Kranti Ranga, became President of Karnataka State Congress (U), and served as Leader of Opposition in Karnataka Legislative Council from 1980 to 1981.

He entered into Karnataka Legislative Assembly as M.L.A. in 1983 representing Thirthahalli constituency and served as Speaker in Legislative Assembly from 1983 to 1985. In 1986, he was elected as a Member of Parliament in Rajya Sabha representing Janata Dal political party. In 1989, he was re-elected as M.L.A. from Thirthahalli constituency and became the Leader of opposition. In 1999, he was elected for a third term as M.L.A. representing Shringeri constituency and became Minister of Law and Parliamentary Affairs until 2004.

In 2008, he resigned from Congress and joined BJP; subsequently, he became a Member of Parliament in 15th Lok Sabha representing Bangalore North from BJP in 2009. In 2011, he also entered Silver screen by acting in Kannada film Nanna Gopala, produced and directed by writer "Lakshman".

He was a member of the Committee on Personnel, Public Grievances, Law and Justice; Committee on Subordinate Legislation; and Committee on members of parliament Local Area Development Scheme from 2009.

Elections Contested
1971 : Lok Sabha member from Chikmagalur (Congress)
1977 : Lok Sabha member from Chikmagalur (Congress)
 Resigned in 1978 to allow Indira Gandhi to contest and enter Lok Sabha 
1978-1983 : MLC in Karnataka Legislative Council  (Congress)
 Left Congress to join Karnataka Kranti Ranga of Devaraj Urs 
1983-1985 : M.L.A in 1983 representing Thirthahalli constituency (Janata Party)
1986 : Rajya Sabha MP (Janata Party, later renamed Janata Dal)
1989 : Karnataka Assembly member representing Thirthahalli constituency (Janata Dal)
1999 : M.L.A representing Shringeri (Congress)
2009 : Lok Sabha member from Bangalore (North) for BJP .

Autobiography
An autobiography of D.B. Chandre Gowda with the name Poornachandra was released on the occasion of his 75th birthday by D. V. Sadananda Gowda, former Chief Minister of Karnataka, and B. S. Yeddyurappa, current Chief Minister of Karnataka. Speaking on occasion B. S. Yeddyurappa said:D. V. Sadananda Gowda calling him his friend, philosopher, and the guide said:

See also
 List of Rajya Sabha members from Karnataka
 List of members of the 15th Lok Sabha of India
 Bangalore North (Lok Sabha constituency)

References

External links
 Shri D. B. Chandre Gowda
 DB Chandre Gowda –  Biography
 D B Chandre Gowda
 CM Released Autobiography of D B Chandre Gowda
 Chandre Gowda faces tough task
 Shri Chandre D.B. Gowda

Praja Socialist Party politicians
Indian National Congress politicians from Karnataka
Bharatiya Janata Party politicians from Karnataka
Janata Dal politicians
Living people
1936 births
People from Chikkamagaluru district
Kannada people
India MPs 1971–1977
India MPs 1977–1979
India MPs 2009–2014
Speakers of the Karnataka Legislative Assembly
Members of the Karnataka Legislative Council
Rajya Sabha members from Karnataka
Lok Sabha members from Karnataka
Leaders of the Opposition in the Karnataka Legislative Assembly
Karnataka MLAs 1983–1985
Karnataka MLAs 1989–1994
Karnataka MLAs 1999–2004
Janata Party politicians
Indian National Congress (U) politicians